Carol D'Onofrio (February 24, 1936 – April 14, 2020) was an American public health researcher who was Emeritus Professor at the University of California, Berkeley, School of Public Health. Her career focused on improving the health of underserved communities, in particular through curtailing the use of tobacco and alcohol.

Early life and education 
D'Onofrio was born in Conrad, Montana. She grew up in Enterprise, Oregon and was a high school student at Walla Walla, Washington. D'Onofrio completed her undergraduate studies at the University of Washington. She majored in English and education, and was named as one of the university's most outstanding women. After spending a year in Chile as a Rotary International Fellow, D'Onofrio moved to East Los Angeles where she worked for the Los Angeles County Department of Public Health. She joined the University of California, Berkeley for graduate studies, where she worked toward a master's then doctorate in public health. She was one of the first students of the UC Berkeley public health program. Her research considered the motivational factors that are associated with the acceptance of contraception postpartum.

Research and career 
D'Onofrio was appointed a tenured Professor in 1973. She concentrated on “reaching the hard-to-reach”. D'Onofrio dedicated her career to the creation and assessment of public health programs for people from marginalized communities. She studied dependencies on tobacco and alcohol, the availability of breast and cervical cancer screening and the improvement of access to palliative care.

D'Onofrio led the United States' first randomized controlled trial on preventing young people from smoking or chewing tobacco. The study involved young people from 38 counties in California. Together with Joan Bloom, D'Onofrio studied breast cancer in young women, and found that women with disabilities were largely ignored from local breast screening initiatives. This observation motivated D'Onofrio to launch Breast Health Access for Women with Disabilities, an initiative that became a national model.

Working with Rosalind Singer, D'Onofrio called out school textbook authors for featuring sugary snacks as rewards for good behavior. She found that cake accounted for one in every twelve food appearances.

Academic service 
D'Onofrio served on the advisory board of the Ethnic Health Institute, with whom she worked on health promotion campaigns that looked to address ethnic disparities. At UC Berkeley, she served on the Academic Senate, Committee on Educational Policy, Committee on the Status of Women and Ethnic Minorities and the Division vice chair and as a member of the Committee for Academic Planning and Resource Allocation.

Awards and honors 
 University of California, Berkeley, School of Public Health, Alumna of the Year Award 2009 
 Fellow of the National Society for Public Health Education
 Alta Bates Summit Medical Center Heroes in Healthcare Lifetime Achievement Award
 School of Public Health's Most Outstanding alumna

Selected publications 
  (thesis)

Personal life 
D'Onofrio had cancer and died in April 2020. She had two children and four grandchildren.

References 

1936 births
2020 deaths
20th-century American women educators
20th-century American educators
University of California, Berkeley alumni
University of California, Berkeley faculty
People from Conrad, Montana
21st-century American women educators
21st-century American educators
20th-century American women writers
21st-century American women writers
Public health researchers
American medical researchers
Women medical researchers
20th-century American non-fiction writers
21st-century American non-fiction writers
American women non-fiction writers
Writers from Montana
University of Washington alumni